Robin Gibb is the first EP released by British singer-songwriter Robin Gibb, released in 1985 on Amiga Records in the German Democratic Republic only.

"Juliet" was originally released as the first single from his 1983 album How Old Are You?. "How Old Are You" was the third single released from the album. "Boys Do Fall in Love" was originally released as the first single from his 1984 album Secret Agent, and "Robot" was also from the same album.

Track listing
 All tracks written and composed by Robin and Maurice Gibb.

References

1985 debut EPs
Robin Gibb albums